, also known as , was the 13th legendary Emperor of Japan, according to the traditional order of succession. Both the Kojiki, and the Nihon Shoki (collectively known as the Kiki) record events that took place during Seimu's alleged lifetime. This legendary Emperor is best known for organizing his local governments by making the first appointments of their kind to provinces under his rule. Seimu had only one recorded wife who bore him a single child; he also had a concubine but she had no children. This is in stark contrast to his father, who is said to have had at least 80 children with multiple wives.

Seimu's reign is conventionally considered to have been from 131 to 190 AD. An issue ultimately occurred when his only son allegedly died at a young age. Seimu appointed one of his nephews to be crown prince before his death in 190 AD, marking the first of later generations which would cede the throne to a non-direct successor. While the location of Seimu's grave (if any) is unknown, he is traditionally venerated at a memorial Shinto tomb. Modern historians have come to the conclusion that the title of "Emperor" and the name "Seimu" was used by later generations to describe this legendary Emperor. It has also been proposed that Seimu actually reigned much later than he is attested.

Legendary narrative
The Japanese have traditionally accepted this sovereign's historical existence, and a mausoleum (misasagi) for Seimu is currently maintained. These chronicles include legends and myths, as well as potential historical facts that have since been exaggerated and/or distorted over time. The records state that Seimu was born to Yasakairi-hime sometime in 84 AD, and was given the name . It is unknown how he was chosen as crown prince, but Wakatarashihiko later ascended to the throne in 131 AD. Seimu is best known for organizing his local governments by appointing the first provincial governors and district officials. While the details of his system of governing remain elusive, at the time Imperial princes were sent to important places in the provinces. These members are designated as wake, which represented their status as a branch of the Imperial family. It has been theorized by Brinkley and Kikuchi that these appointments of local governors were designed to extend the "prestige of the Court". Those that were eligible included "men of merit", Imperial princes, or chiefs of aboriginal tribes.

The records state that Seimu had a wife named , who was the daughter of Take-oshiyama-tari-ne. Oho-takara bore the Emperor one child, named . Seimu's only son appears to have died at a young age as the Emperor appointed Yamato Takeru's son as Crown Prince, before his own death in 190 AD at the age 107 years old. His nephew Tarashinakatsuhiko was later enthroned as the next emperor in 192 AD. Seimu's death marked an end of direct lineage from legendary Emperor Jimmu, and was the first split branch of others that later followed.

Known information

Emperor Seimu is regarded by historians as a "legendary Emperor" as there is insufficient material available for further verification and study. His existence is open to debate given this lack of information. If Seimu did exist, there is no evidence to suggest that the title tennō was used during the time period to which his reign has been assigned. It is much more likely that he was a chieftain, or local clan leader, and the polity he ruled would have only encompassed a small portion of modern-day Japan. The name Seimu-tennō was more than likely assigned to him posthumously by later generations. His name might have been regularized centuries after the lifetime ascribed to Seimu, possibly during the time in which legends about the origins of the Yamato dynasty were compiled as the chronicles known today as the Kojiki. There is a possibility that Seimu ruled during the first half of the 4th century when Japan became a unified state ruled from Yamato, making these accounts "not improbable".

While the actual site of Seimu's grave is not known, the Emperor is traditionally venerated at a memorial Shinto shrine (misasagi) at Nara. The Imperial Household Agency designates this location as Seimu's mausoleum, and is formally named Saki no Tatanami no misasagi. Outside of the Kiki, the reign of Emperor Kinmei ( – 571 AD) is the first for which contemporary historiography has been able to assign verifiable dates. The conventionally accepted names and dates of the early Emperors were not confirmed as "traditional" though, until the reign of Emperor Kanmu between 737 and 806 AD.

See also
 Emperor of Japan
 List of Emperors of Japan
 Imperial cult

Notes

References

Further reading
 Aston, William George. (1896).  Nihongi: Chronicles of Japan from the Earliest Times to A.D. 697. London: Kegan Paul, Trench, Trubner.  
 Brown, Delmer M. and Ichirō Ishida, eds. (1979).  Gukanshō: The Future and the Past. Berkeley: University of California Press. ;  
 Chamberlain, Basil Hall. (1920). The Kojiki. Read before the Asiatic Society of Japan on 12 April, 10 May, and 21 June 1882; reprinted May 1919.  
 Ponsonby-Fane, Richard Arthur Brabazon. (1959).  The Imperial House of Japan. Kyoto: Ponsonby Memorial Society. 
 Titsingh, Isaac. (1834). Nihon Ōdai Ichiran; ou,  Annales des empereurs du Japon.  Paris: Royal Asiatic Society, Oriental Translation Fund of Great Britain and Ireland.  
 Varley, H. Paul. (1980).  Jinnō Shōtōki: A Chronicle of Gods and Sovereigns. New York: Columbia University Press. ;  

 
 

Legendary Emperors of Japan
People of Yayoi-period Japan
2nd-century monarchs in Asia
2nd-century Japanese monarchs